The Agfa Optima 1535 Sensor is a 35 mm rangefinder camera manufactured by the German company Agfa in 1977.

It has the typical big finder of the Optima series, but on this special model it is combined with a superimposed coupled rangefinder. Shutter speed is controlled electronically by a CdS meter, with speeds from 15 sec. to 1/1000 sec. A special feature of the series is the film advance lever which can be switched to also rewind the film at its end.

Specifications
 Lens: Agfa Solitar S 1:2.8/40mm, 4 lenses in 3 groups
 Focus: 0.9 m to infinity
 Shutter speed: ~15 – 1/1000 (electronic shutter) 
 Aperture: 2.8 – 22
 Exposure mode: full auto
 Go/no-go green and red LED in viewfinder, as shutter speed indication
 Filter size: 49mm
 Film type: 135 film
 Film speed scale: ASA 25 – 500
 Battery: Three P625U
 Size: 104 × 69 × 56 mm
 Weight: 260 gram
 Self-timer: no

External links
 35mm Compact: Manual (German)
 Alfred's Camera Page: Agfa Optima 1535 long description
 Optiksammlung Christian Zahn: Agfa Optima 1536
 The Agfa Optima sensor electronic family (German)

Agfa rangefinder cameras